Cynthia Carter DeFelice (born 1951) is an American children's writer. She has written 16 novels and 12 picture books for young readers. The intended audience for her novels is children of reading ages nine to twelve.

Life and career
Carter was born in 1951 in Philadelphia, Pennsylvania. Her father was a psychiatrist, and her mother was an English teacher, who stopped working to raise Cynthia and her siblings. DeFelice credits her mother for sparking her interest in books. Among her three siblings is former US Secretary of Defense Ashton Carter. She began writing children's books in 1987. She lives in Geneva, New York.

Bibliography

Children's novels
The Strange Night Writing of Jessamine Colter, Atheneum (1988), 
Weasel, Atheneum (1990),  (1993 Sequoyah Book Award winner)
Devil’s Bridge, Gale Group (1992), 
The Light on Hogback Hill Atheneum (1993), 
Lostman’s River, Atheneum (1994), 
The Ghost of Poplar Point, Farrar Straus (1997), 
The Ghost of Fossil Glen, Farrar Straus (1998), 
Nowhere to Call Home Farrar Straus (1999), 
Death at Devil’s Bridge Farrar Straus (2000), 
The Ghost and Mrs. Hobbs, Farrar Straus (2001)
The Ghost of Cutler Creek, Farrar Straus (2004), 
Under the Same Sky, Farrar Straus (2005), 
Missing Manatee, Farrar Straus (2005),  (nominated for a 2006 Edgar Award by the Mystery Writers of America)
Bringing Ezra Back, Farrar Straus (2006) (sequel to Weasel)
Signal, Farrar Straus (2009), 
Wild Life, Farrar Straus (2011)
Fort, Farrar, Straus and Giroux (2015),

Selected children's picture books
 Dancing Skeleton, illustrated by Robert Andrew Parker (Atheneum Books, 1989),  – named a Best Book of the Year by the Library of Congress
 Clever Crow, illus. S. D. Schindler (Atheneum, 1998), 
 Cold Feet, illus. Robert Andrew Parker (DK Books for Children, 2000), . 2001 Boston Globe–Horn Book Award for best picture book
 Casey in the Bath, illus. Farrar Straus Giroux (Macmillan, 1998)

References

External links

 
Cynthia DeFelice at publisher Macmillan US

 

1951 births
Living people
20th-century American novelists
21st-century American novelists
American children's writers
American science fiction writers
American women novelists
People from Geneva, New York
Writers from Philadelphia
American women children's writers
Women science fiction and fantasy writers
20th-century American women writers
21st-century American women writers
Novelists from New York (state)
Novelists from Pennsylvania